Elisabeth Franziska von Schuch-Ganzel (12 December 1891 – 10 January 1990) also Liesel von Schuch, Liesel Schuch-Ganzel, née von Schuch) was a German coloratura soprano

Life 

Born in Dresden, Schuch grew up with her parents, the conductor Ernst von Schuch and the opera singer Clementine von Schuch-Proska, in Niederlößnitz (today a district of Radebeul). She was a sister of the soprano Käthe von Schuch-Schmidt and the violoncellist Hans von Schuch.

She made her debut in La traviata as Violetta in Wiesbaden in 1913. A coloratura soprano like her mother, she became a Royal Saxon Court Opera Singer, later a Dresden Kammersängerin, and was a permanent member of the Sächsische Staatsoper until 1935. Until 1967, she worked as a teacher of singing at the Hochschule für Musik Carl Maria von Weber Dresden.

She performed in Dresden and Vienna, and in Dresden she gave solo performances in the Dresden Frauenkirche, the Kreuzkirche and the Dresden Cathedral.

In 1988, on the occasion of her 97th birthday, she was made an honorary citizen of Dresden.

She was married to the Corvette Captain Wilhelm Ganzel. Together they had one son (Christian Schuch-Ganzel).

Schuch-Ganzel died in Dresden at the age of 98. She was buried at the  near her parents.

Further reading 
 Erika Eschebach (ed.), Andrea Rudolph (ed.): Die Schuchs. Eine Künstlerfamilie in Dresden. Sandstein Verlag, Dresden 2014, .
 Michael Hochmuth: Chronik der Dresdner Oper, vol. 2: Die Solisten. Dresden 2004.
 Karl-Josef Kutsch, Leo Riemens: Großes Sängerlexikon. Bern und Stuttgart 1987/1991.
 Straßennamen in Dresden – Reine Männersache?, Part 2, 2004.

References

External links 
 
 Liste von Bildern aus der Sammlung der UB Frankfurt
 Nachlass Liesel Schuch-Ganzel in der Saxon State and University Library Dresden

German operatic sopranos
Academic staff of the Hochschule für Musik Carl Maria von Weber
1891 births
1990 deaths
Musicians from Dresden